The Rutara or Runyakitara languages (endonym: Orutara, Orunyakitara) are a group of closely related Bantu languages spoken in the African Great Lakes region. They include languages such as Runyoro, Runyankore and Ruhaya. The language group takes its name from the Empire of Kitara.

Classification
Rutara is divided into two branches, North and South Rutara, and two independent languages that have more particular features. The languages are:

North Rutara languages
 Nyoro-Tooro (Runyoro-Rutooro)
 Nkore-Kiga (Runyankore-Rukiga)
 Ruuli (Ruruuli)
 Talinga-Bwisi (Lutalinga/Lubwisi)
 Hema (Ruhema)

Standardized language
 Runyakitara

South Rutara languages
 Haya (Ruhaya)
 Nyambo (Runyambo)

Zinza and Kerewe (independent)
 Zinza (Ruzinza)
 Kerewe (Rukerebe/Kikerebe)

History
According to glottochronological calculations, Proto-Rutara emerged in the year 700AD. Proto-Rutara was first spoken in the Kagera Region of Tanzania near Bukoba before spreading northwards into Uganda and the DRC.

References

Great Lakes Bantu languages